Poway High School is a four-year secondary school in southern California accredited by the Western Association of Schools and Colleges. Established in 1961, its approximately 2,408 students are from the city of Poway and the community of Rancho Bernardo in San Diego. The school has curricula for university-bound, college-bound, and vocation-bound graduates. About 1% of the high school's graduates join the military, 3% get civilian employment; 1% enroll in special schools, 37% enroll in two-year colleges, and 54% go to four-year colleges and universities. Some of its alumni are famous athletes.

Overview 
The four-year secondary school is accredited by the Western Association of Schools and Colleges. It has approximately 2,408 students and employs 90 teachers, 62 support staff, 4 administrators, 4 counselors, 1 psychologist and 1 librarian. The length of its class periods vary and add to 297 minutes per week. Every Monday is a "professional growth day", with 54-minute periods. It is on a trimester-based system with class periods 70 minutes long from Tuesday through Thursday. Periods are 65 minutes on Friday.

The high school has a campus with several buildings. Elective course offerings include agriculture, floral design, architectural design, and computer animation. Other activities include automobile repair and design, choir, marching band, and photography.  Its athletic teams are called the Titans. It has a Theatre Guild. The school also offers PLTW engineering courses and has a campus-affiliated FIRST robotics team, Team Spyder 1622.

History 
In 2004, the school forbade a student from wearing an anti-gay T-shirt during the school's gay–straight alliance's Day of Silence. The student, Tyler Chase Harper, filed suit, claiming that the school had violated his constitutional rights. The case was Harper v. Poway Unified School District. In 2006, the United States Court of Appeals for the Ninth Circuit, in a divided decision, denied the student's claim and held that the school's regulation of student speech in this case was constitutional. The student sought review in the U.S. Supreme Court; in 2007, the Court vacated the judgment as moot because Harper had graduated.

In 2011, in a separate case,  Johnson v. Poway Unified School District, the Ninth Circuit found that the school board could order a teacher to remove religious decorations (specifically, 7-foot wide, 2-foot high banners bearing Christian phrases) from his classroom, holding that the speech of teachers in school settings is government speech.

Community overview 
The school was established in September 1961 to be the first of five high schools for the Poway Unified School District. The general population in the district reached about 186,195 in 2014, of which about 33,000 were students, including kindergarten through the twelfth grade. The students of Poway High School are from the suburban communities of Poway and Rancho Bernardo which are 15 miles northeast of the City of San Diego. In rare cases, students living in the nearby town of Ramona attend Poway High School because it is better funded.

Enrollment 
Based on data for the 2019-2020 school year, 2,293 students attend Poway High School. When divided by grade level, 618 students are in 9th grade, 555 in 10th, 574 in 11th, and 546 in 12th. Student enrollment is 49.5% White, 29.4% Hispanic or Latino, 8% Asian, 8.2% two or more races, 1.4% African American, 0.3% Native Hawaiian or Pacific Islander, and 0.2% Native American or Alaska Native.

Academics 
Students take required classes in English, Social Science, Mathematics, Physical Science, Biological Science, Health, Physical Education, and Fine Arts. They must pass the CAHSEE in English Language Arts and Mathematics. They also take a required number of elective classes. There are three majors: University-bound, College-bound, and high school graduation. The last take electives based on their vocational interests. There are advanced placement, honors, and occupational courses. There are also English language and remedial courses.

In the 2012–2013 school year, Poway students scored higher than the national mean on the SAT test, 784 students took AP exams and 4 were National Merit semi-finalists. Student pursuits following graduation have been: 5% in the military, 3% full-time employment; 1% in special schools, 37% in two-year colleges and 54% four-year colleges and universities.

Notable alumni 

 the 3 original members of Agent 51
 John Baldwin - figure skater
 Albrey Battle – football player
 Walter Bernard - football player (transferred to Rancho Buena Vista High School senior year)
 Miguel Berry – soccer player
 Brett Bochy - baseball player
 Jud Buechler – basketball player
 Kellye Cash – Miss America 1987
 Kraig Chiles - soccer player
 Marie Anne Chiment - Award-winning set and costume designer
 Greg Dalby - soccer player and coach
 Tom DeLonge – guitarist/vocalist of Blink-182, Box Car Racer, and Angels and Airwaves
 Alex Dickerson (born 1990) - Major League Baseball player for the San Francisco Giants
 Lauren Elaine – Actress, celebrity fashion designer
 David Goeddel – biotechnology pioneer
 Tina Guo – cellist associated with Hans Zimmer
 Tony Gwynn Jr. – baseball player
 Charley Hoffman – PGA Tour Member. Won the 2007 Bob Hope Chrysler Classic, the 2010 Deutsche Bank Championship, the 2014 OHL Classic at Mayakoba, and the 2016 Valero Texas Open.
 Nate Houser - soccer player
 Connor Joe - baseball player
 Bradley Klahn - tennis player
 John Knotwell - Utah politician
 Bobby Lee – comedian/actor on MADtv, host of TigerBelly and Bad Friends podcast.
 Brian Maienschein - California politician
 Susan Meissner – author
 Thomas Neal - baseball player and coach
 Tyler Nevin – baseball player
 Kevin Newman – baseball player
 Anisha Nicole - R&B and hip-hop singer
 Phil Plantier – baseball player
 Brian Rast – professional poker player
 Xavier Scruggs - baseball player
 Stephanie Seymour – model
 Dave Smith - baseball player and coach
 Jesse Taylor – wrestler; currently a professional mixed martial artist
Darshan Upadhyaya – League of Legends professional player
 Drew Wahlroos – linebacker for the St. Louis Rams.
 Marvell Wynne II – soccer player
 Austin Wynns - baseball player for the San Francisco Giants

References

External links 
Poway High School site
 School Accountability Report Card Summary (2003–2004) (pdf file)
Poway High School Iliad (Newspaper)

High schools in San Diego County, California
Poway, California
Public high schools in California
Educational institutions established in 1961
1961 establishments in California